FIAP, an acronym, may refer to:

Fédération Internationale de l'Art Photographique, the International Federation of Photographic Art
Festival Iberoamericano de Publicidad, the Ibero-American Advertising Festival
Federation of Inter-Asian Philately
Federazione italiana associazioni partigiane
Fellow of the Institution of Analysts and Programmers